The Sixteenth Amendment to the Constitution of Pakistan (Urdu: آئین پاکستان میں سولہویں ترمیم) was passed by the National Assembly on July 27, 1999, by the Senate on June 3, 1999 and promulgated on August 5, 1999.

In order to encourage representation of minorities and people from disadvantaged areas in services of Pakistan, the Constitution of Pakistan in Article 27 has imposed a 10 year quota for services, which in 1985 was increased to 20 years, in the sixteenth amendment this limit was increased to 40 years.

Text

See also
Zia-ul-Haq's Islamization
Separation of powers
Nawaz Sharif
Benazir Bhutto
Pervez Musharraf
Amendments to the Constitution of Pakistan

References

External links
Full-text of the Sixteenth Amendment

01